Live-In is an American sitcom created by Robert Sternin and Prudence Fraser that aired briefly on CBS from March 20 to May 22, 1989. The series focuses on young Australian au pair Lisa Wells (Lisa Patrick) integrating into the home life of a New Jersey family and their teenage son Danny Mathews' (Chris Young) efforts to become her boyfriend. Nine episodes were filmed in Los Angeles, which CBS hoped would draw a younger audience to the network.

While premiering to decent ratings, subsequent episodes suffered from low viewership, and CBS canceled the mid-season replacement before the final episode aired. The show received highly negative reviews from television critics; some named it one of the worst series of 1989 and felt it did not live up to CBS' reputation for airing high-quality programming. They described the writing as childish and thought the content was unoriginal, but were mostly approving of Patrick's role.

Premise and characters

The Mathews, a suburban New Jersey family, hire Lisa Wells (Lisa Patrick), an attractive young Australian woman who grew up in a large household in the Australian outback as a live-in nanny to take care of their newborn daughter Melissa Mathews (Melissa and Allison Lindsay). Her mother Sarah Mathews (Kimberly Farr) works as a manager at Macy's in Manhattan; father Ed Mathews (Hugh Maguire) is the proprietor of Mathews Sporting Goods Store in New Jersey. The couple has two other children: oldest son Danny Mathews (Chris Young), a high school sophomore determined to become Lisa's boyfriend; and Peter Mathews (David Moscow), a freshman with less of an interest in girls and who gets along amicably with her.

The supporting cast comprises Muriel Spiegelman (Jenny O'Hara), Sarah's friend and prying neighbor; and Danny's best friend Gator (Lightfield Lewis), who is also enamored of Lisa. Comedic situations arise from Danny and Gator's obsession with girls and how Lisa spurns their advances. Storylines also revolve around her adjustment to American culture, and Sarah often expresses second thoughts about Lisa spending more time with Melissa than she can.

Production
Robert Sternin and Prudence Fraser created and executive produced Live-In; their company Sternin & Fraser Ink, Inc. handled production along with ELP Communications. The couple had previously written scripts for shows like Who's the Boss?, and produced 1987 ABC television series The Charmings. Filming began in February 1989 in Los Angeles, where episodes were taped twice in front of two separate audiences. CBS initially gave Live-In a seven-episode order; the network requested additional episodes after the broadcast of the second. 

Ray Colcord composed the series' music, including its theme, a cover of the Turtles' "Happy Together". The song is present in the Castle Bryant Johnsen-designed title sequence, which The Philadelphia Inquirers David Bianculli thought resembled a music video. According to the director of music at the show's distributor, Columbia Pictures Television, a contemporary recording was used because producers "wanted to attract baby boomers who remembered the original and the younger audience who didn't".

Casting
Chris Young had previously played roles in several movies and the ABC television series Max Headroom. At the time of production, the 17-year-old was considered an up-and-coming teen idol who could be launched into stardom with a role on a sitcom like Live-In. As his parents had established careers in Philadelphia, Young stayed with his aunt and uncle while the show was filmed. While he received offers to star on other series, Young chose Live-In because he liked its premise the most.

Conversely, Lisa Patrick made her acting debut on the show. The program's casting director noticed the Australian model's appearance in an AT&T commercial and invited her to a Los Angeles audition in December 1988. Due to her inexperience, she attended acting coach Bill Hudnut's private workshops for several days each week to improve her skills and become accustomed to performing in front of an audience. He was also present on the show's set and helped Patrick review her lines privately before she did so with the rest of the cast.

Episodes

Broadcast and cancellation

Live-In premiered on CBS on March 20, 1989, as a mid-season replacement in the 1988–89 United States television season, taking the time slot of Newhart. The network scheduled the series on Monday nights at 8 p.m. ET preceding Heartland, a new sitcom starring Brian Keith. Both series featured predominately young casts and teen-oriented storylines that CBS hoped would draw young adult viewers. With 20 percent of households watching television at the time of its broadcast tuned in to the show, Variety said the first episode was "good news for CBS" as it improved upon the network's average in the time slot that season. Subsequent episodes' ratings declined, however, with most only receiving an audience share of about 14 percent. 

Within the official television season which ended on April 16, 1989, Live-In averaged a household rating of 10.3 according to Nielsen Media Research, placing 83rd among the 125 series aired. CBS canceled the show a month later on May 19, 1989, the same day it announced a schedule for the following television season. The ninth and final episode aired three days later on May 22. According to The Wall Street Journal, the show was one of several youth-oriented series, along with TV 101 and Dirty Dancing, which were "particularly catastrophic" for CBS that season. The network struggled to promote Live-In because their popular programs at the time such as 60 Minutes were not geared towards a young audience. Outside of the United States, the series was simulcast by Global in the Canadian province of Ontario, and Nine broadcast it in Australia from October to December 1989. Fraser later said she thought the show "was a miscalculation ... [because] it offended a lot of people".

Critical reception
Live-In was "heavily criticized" by reviewers; a poll of 28 American newspaper television critics named it the worst series of the first half of 1989. In advance of the premiere, David Bianculli said CBS should no longer be considered a high-quality network for airing it and felt the program's "only redeeming moment is the title sequence". Eric Mink of the St. Louis Post-Dispatch agreed, writing that "with the exception of the ... stylish opening credit sequence, [the] show is so blatantly stupid it defies belief". The Cincinnati Enquirers John Kiesewetter cited the series as an example of declining network standards at the time, as did the Asbury Park Press Robert Strauss. Writing that it undermined CBS' public commitment to high-quality programming, Hester Riches of the Vancouver Sun felt the show diminished others on Mondays, such as Murphy Brown.

The program's script received negative reviews. Jeff Jarvis of People graded the series an "F" and remarked "CBS must have been desperate to fill a half hour" to broadcast it. Referencing Danny and Gator's interactions, he deemed it "the most infantile show ever on Mondays—or perhaps ever on the air". In Variety, Tony Scott criticized the "plain bad ... breast-and-crotch humor" and felt the show's writers lacked the "inventiveness or finesse with the characters" that could make the show successful. Rating it 2 out of 5 stars, Bud Wilkinson of The Arizona Republic described the dialogue as "excessively juvenile". Diane Holloway of the Austin American-Statesman called the show "incredibly immature" and said the financial burden on a working family to hire a live-in made the premise implausible. Jon Burlingame agreed, questioning in United Feature Syndicate how the Mathews could afford an au pair—much less an Australian one. The Shreveport Journals Nancy Morris considered it unrealistic for a woman of Patrick's appearance to work in such a role.

Many considered the series unimaginative. Citing the premiere's shower scene, Steve Hall of The Indianapolis Star described Sternin and Fraser as lacking "an original funny idea in their heads" as he felt it was similar to that in Porky's (1981). He also thought Ed, Peter, and Muriel were the cliché "distracted dad, pesky younger brother, [and] kooky neighbor" sitcom characters. Kathryn Baker of the Associated Press disagreed, praising the pair for writing "one of the better  of the season". In a positive review, Newsdays David Friedman felt the program followed the tried-and-true "assemble a cast viewers at home want to spend time with, make sure at least one of them is extremely good-looking, then give them a few funny things to say" formula successfully. Mark Dawidziak of the Akron Beacon Journal, however, criticized the show and its characters for being derivative, and Wilkinson felt it was predictable. Writing for the Tyler Courier-Times, Grace C. Biggers felt Live-In was a rip-off of Mr. Belvedere due to its similar plot.

The reception to Patrick's performance was mostly positive. Morris described her chemistry with Young as "electric", Biggers gave particular praise to her, and Kay Gardella of the New York Daily News said she "does fine" in her role despite the show's "thin story line". Pitying Patrick, The Washington Posts Tom Shales described her character as "the only remotely interesting element" of a show beneath her potential. Michael Dougan concurred in the San Francisco Examiner, writing that Patrick stood out from the rest of the cast and deserved better than Live-In. In contrast, Richard Glover of The Sydney Morning Herald sarcastically remarked she "demonstrated mastery of all the major emotions, including surprise (eyes opened wide) and happiness (eyebrows raised, teeth bared)".

Notes

References

External links
  

1989 American television series debuts
1989 American television series endings
1980s American sitcoms
CBS original programming
English-language television shows
Television shows set in New Jersey
Television series about families
Television series by Sony Pictures Television